Olga Slapina is a Soviet sprint canoer who competed in the late 1980s. She won two medals in the K-4 500 m event at the ICF Canoe Sprint World Championships with a silver in 1986 and a bronze in 1987.

References

Living people
Soviet female canoeists
Year of birth missing (living people)
Russian female canoeists
ICF Canoe Sprint World Championships medalists in kayak